Results from Norwegian football (soccer) in the year 1912.

Class A of local association leagues
Class A of local association leagues (kretsserier) is the predecessor of a national league competition. The champions qualify for the 1912 Norwegian Cup.

Norwegian Cup

First round

|colspan="3" style="background-color:#97DEFF"|29 September 1912

Semi-finals

|colspan="3" style="background-color:#97DEFF"|30 September 1912

|-
|colspan="3" style="background-color:#97DEFF"|6 October 1912

Final

National team

Sources:

References

External links
RSSSF Football Archive

 
Seasons in Norwegian football